The 2017 FIBA U16 Women's European Championship Division B was the 14th edition of the Division B of the European basketball championship for women's national under-16 teams. It was played in Skopje, Republic of Macedonia, from 17 to 26 August 2017. Denmark women's national under-16 basketball team won the tournament.

Participating teams

  (14th place, 2016 FIBA U16 Women's European Championship Division A)
  (16th place, 2016 FIBA U16 Women's European Championship Division A)

  (15th place, 2016 FIBA U16 Women's European Championship Division A)

First round
In the first round, the teams were drawn into four groups. The first two teams from each group will advance to the quarterfinals, the third and fourth teams will advance to the 9th–16th place playoffs, the other teams will play in the 17th–22nd place classification.

Group A

Group B

Group C

Group D

17th–22nd place classification

Group E

Group F

21st place match

19th place match

17th place match

9th–16th place playoffs

Championship playoffs

Final standings

References

External links
FIBA official website

2017
2017–18 in European women's basketball
International youth basketball competitions hosted by North Macedonia
FIBA U16
Sports competitions in Skopje
August 2017 sports events in Europe